0000 may refer to:
the year 10,000 problem
a null train reporting number or headcode
a suffix to a time indicating Coordinated Universal Time, rather than a local time zone
the null character
Midnight in 24-hour clock